Serhiy Serhiyovych Kravchenko (born 24 April 1983) is a Ukrainian retired professional football midfielder and current coach.

Career
Kravchenko began his career in the Shakhtar Donetsk reserves and youth team in 2002.

Qarabağ
For the 2005–06 season, where he played for Qarabağ FK in the Azerbaijan Premier League. His club finished fifth at the end of the season.

Vorskla Poltava
Kravchenko moved to Vorskla Poltava in March 2006. There, when new coach Mykola Pavlov arrived in 2007, Kravchenko began to shine exceptionally.

In the 2007–08 season, the team finished 8th in the Ukrainian Premier League, which was its best result since the 1999–2000 season.

In the first half of the 2008–09 season, Vorksla made it the semifinals of the Ukrainian Cup which was their highest result in that competition ever. The team was also 4th in the league table. Kravchenko contributed scored 4 goals in 17 matches as well as several assists during this part of the season.

Dynamo Kyiv
On 28 July 2008, he officially signed with Ukrainian giants Dynamo Kyiv, but there is still questions when he will join them in the summer or in the winter when he becomes a free agent. Kravchenko will be entirely owned by the club on 28 January 2009, as reported by the Dynamo Kyiv official website.

Dnipro Dnipropetrovsk
On 23 December 2009 Kravchenko was sold to Dnipro for an undisclosed fee.

Volyn Lustk

On 6 July 2014 after his contract ran up with Dnipro Dnipropetrovsk, free agent Serhiy Kravchenko made a transfer to Ukrainian Premier League club Volyn Lutsk.

International
Kravchenko has been a regular for the Ukraine national football team with head coach Oleksiy Mykhailychenko since teammate Oleh Husiev got injured. He was called with four other newcomers. He made the most of it when he scored the winning goal in a friendly against Poland.

International goals
Scores and results list Ukraine's goal tally first.

Personal life
Kravchenko is married to Tetiana. His father is Ukrainian football player and football coach Serhiy Kravchenko. His older brother is Ukrainian racecar driver – Andriy Kravchenko. He greatly admires French star Zinedine Zidane.

Honors
UEFA Europa League runner-up (1) 2014–15

References

External links
 Kravchenko's Profile on the Dynamo Kyiv website
 
 
 
 

1983 births
Living people
Footballers from Donetsk
Ukrainian footballers
FC Vorskla Poltava players
Ukraine international footballers
FC Shakhtar Luhansk players
FC Monolit Kostiantynivka players
FC Shakhtar-2 Donetsk players
FC Shakhtar-3 Donetsk players
FC Dynamo Kyiv players
Qarabağ FK players
FC Dnipro players
FC Volyn Lutsk players
SC Dnipro-1 players
FC Chornomorets Odesa players
Ukrainian Premier League players
Ukrainian First League players
Ukrainian Second League players
Ukrainian Amateur Football Championship players
Association football midfielders
Ukrainian expatriate footballers
Expatriate footballers in Azerbaijan
Ukrainian expatriate sportspeople in Azerbaijan
Ukrainian football managers